is a town located in Echi District in eastern Shiga Prefecture, Japan. , the town had an estimated population of 21,411 in 8310 households and a population density of 940 persons per km².

Geography
Aishō is located in east-central Shiga Prefecture in the flatlands of the Ōmi Basin.

Surrounding municipalities
Shiga Prefecture
 Hikone 
 Higashiōmi
 Kōra 
 Taga
 Toyosato

Climate
Aishō has a Humid subtropical climate (Köppen Cfa) characterized by warm summers and cool winters with light to no snowfall.  The average annual temperature in Aishō is 12.9 °C. The average annual rainfall is 1810 mm with September as the wettest month. The temperatures are highest on average in August, at around 24.7 °C, and lowest in January, at around 1.3 °C.

Demographics
Per Japanese census data, the population of Aishō has grown slightly over the past 50 years.

History
The area of Aishō was part of ancient Ōmi Province. During the Edo period, Echigawa-juku was the 65th post station on the Nakasendō highway connecting Kyoto with eastern Japan. The village of Echigawa was established on April 1, 1889 with the establishment of the modern municipalities system. It was raised to town status on October 1, 1909 and merged with the neighboring village of Toyokuni in 1955. The town of Aishō was founded on February 13, 2006, when the towns of Echigawa and Hatashō merged.

Government
Aishō has a mayor-council form of government with a directly elected mayor and a unicameral city council of 1４ members. Aishō contributes one member to the Shiga Prefectural Assembly. In terms of national politics, the town is part of Shiga 2nd district of the lower house of the Diet of Japan.

Economy
Agriculture has dominated the local economy since ancient times. Manufacturing includes a number of small to medium sized food processing and metals processing factories.

Education
Aishō has four public elementary schools and two public middle schools operated by the town government, and one public high school operated by the Shiga Prefectural Board of Education. The prefecture also operates one special education school for the handicapped.

International schools
 Colégio Sant'Ana - Brazilian school

Transportation

Railway
 Ohmi Railway – Main Line

Highway
  Meishin Expressway

Sister city relations
 West Bend, Wisconsin, United States

Local attractions
 Kongōrin-ji, a major Tendai Buddhist temple

Noted people from Aishō 
Yasujirō Tsutsumi, entrepreneur and politician

References

External links 

Aishō official website 

Towns in Shiga Prefecture
Aisho, Shiga